Wedding dress of Princess Louise may refer to:
 Wedding dress of Princess Louise of the United Kingdom
 Wedding dress of Princess Louise Margaret of Prussia